Taimar Peterkop (born 20 January 1977 in Tallinn) is an Estonian civil servant.

Since on 10 December 2018, he is State Secretary of Estonia.

2015–2018, he was the head of Estonian Information System Authority.

References

Living people
1977 births
Estonian civil servants